Aurelio Fierro (13 September 1923 – 11 March 2005) was a successful Italian actor and singer who specialized in songs in the Neapolitan dialect.

Career

He was born in Montella, in the Province of Avellino, Italy. His singing career began in 1951, after he came first place in a singing competition. He signed a recording contract with Durium Records to record songs in Italian and Napulitano. The following year, with the song "Rose, poveri rrose!", he came first in the Castellammare di Stabia music festival, and decided to become a professional singer.

His first big hit was with "Scapricciatiello", by Pacifico Vento and Ferdinando Albano, in 1954. In 1957 his song "Lazzarella" (written by Domenico Modugno and Riccardo Pazzaglia) was a success at the Naples song festival (Festival d'a Canzone Napulitana) and the eponymous film which followed (directed by Carlo Ludovico Bragaglia), in which he performed, was also a great success with the public. In the following years, he took part in the San Remo song festival six times and toured worldwide, which contributed to his success abroad in the United States, South America and Japan. He was the singer of the winning song at the Naples song festival in 1961, 1965 and 1969.

His best-known songs are probably "Guaglione", recorded in 1956, and "A pizza" (by Alberto Testa and Bruno Martelli), from the Naples song festival of 1966.

He opened a restaurant in Naples, A canzuncella, where he entertained the patrons. He studied the Neapolitan language (Napulitano) and published a grammar (Grammatica della lingua napoletana) and a book on Neapolitan legends (Fiabe e leggende napoletane). He died after a stroke at Cardarelli Hospital, Naples.

See also
Article on 'A pizza on Napulitano Wikipedia

Albums (selection)
1955: Melodie del Golfo - 1 (Durium, ms Al 509)
1955: Melodie del Golfo - 2 (Durium, ms Al 510)
1955: Canzoni d'altri tempi - 1 (Durium, ms Al 518)
1956: 5º Festival della canzone - Sanremo 1955 (Durium, ms Al 524)
1956: Melodie del Golfo - 3 (Durium, ms Al 526)
1956: Melodie del Golfo - 4 (Durium, ms Al 546)

Singles (selection)
1955: 'O surdato 'nnammurato/'O mare 'e Mergellina (Durium, Ld A 6006)
1956: Guaglione/Dincello tu (Durium, Ld A 6053)
1957: Lucianella/Chella là (Durium, Ld A 6083)
1957: Lazzarella/Napule, sole mio (Durium, Ld A 6102)

References

External links

People from Avellino
Italian male actors
1923 births
2005 deaths
20th-century Italian  male singers